
Year 387 (CCCLXXXVII) was a common year starting on Friday (link will display the full calendar) of the Julian calendar. At the time, it was known as the Year of the Consulship of Augustus and Eutropius (or, less frequently, year 1140 Ab urbe condita). The denomination 387 for this year has been used since the early medieval period, when the Anno Domini calendar era became the prevalent method in Europe for naming years.

Events 
 By place 
 Roman Empire 
 Spring – Emperor Theodosius I increases the taxes in Antioch. A peasant uprising leads to a riot, and public buildings are set afire. Theodosius sends imperial troops to quell the disturbance, and closes the public baths and theatres.  
 Magnus Maximus, usurping emperor of the West, invades Italy. Emperor Valentinian II, age 16, is forced out of Rome. He flees with his mother Justina and sisters to Thessaloniki (Thrace).
 Winter – The widowed emperor Theodosius I takes Valentinian II under his protection, and marries his sister Flavia Galla.

 Persia 
 Peace of Acilisene: King Shapur III signs a treaty with Theodosius I. Armenia is divided in two kingdoms, and becomes a vassal state of the Roman Empire and Persia.

 By topic 
 Art and Science 
 Oribase, Greek doctor, publishes a treatise on paralysis and bleedings.

 Religion 
 Augustine is baptized on Easter Vigil by Saint Ambrose, Bishop of Milan.

Births 
 Vardan Mamikonian, Armenian military leader (d. 451)

Deaths 
 Aelia Flaccilla, Roman Empress and wife of Theodosius I
 Alatheus, chieftain of the Ostrogoths
 Saint Monica, mother of Augustine of Hippo
 Zhu Fatai, Chinese Buddhist scholar (b. 320)

References